The UEFA Men's Player of the Year Award (previously known as the UEFA Best Player in Europe Award) is an association football award given to the footballer playing for a men's football club in Europe that is considered the best in the previous season of both club and national team competition. The award, created in 2011 by UEFA in partnership with European Sports Media (ESM) group, was initially aimed at reviving the European Footballer of the Year Award (Ballon d'Or), which was merged with the FIFA World Player of the Year Award in 2010 to become the FIFA Ballon d'Or. It also replaced the UEFA Club Footballer of the Year award.

Cristiano Ronaldo is the only player to have won the award three times as well as twice in a row. Female players are awarded the UEFA Women's Player of the Year Award, introduced in 2013.

Criteria
According to UEFA, the award "recognise[s] the best player, irrespective of his nationality, playing for a football club within the territory of a UEFA member association during the previous season." Players are judged by their performances in all competitions, domestic and international, and at club and national team levels throughout the season.

Voting
At the beginning, the award's voting format was a return to the old Ballon d'Or, which was decided purely by journalists.

In the first round of voting, 53 sports journalists representing each of the UEFA national associations provided a list of their three best-ranked players from one to three, with the first player receiving five points, the second three points and the third one point. The three players with the most points overall were shortlisted. The jury comprised renowned sports journalists representing each of UEFA's national associations, from RTV Albania to the Daily Post in Wales via members of European Sports Media, with whom UEFA collaborated on this award. The final vote, also by the journalists, then took place live via electronic voting during the presentation ceremony.

In 2017, however, UEFA added 80 coaches, from the clubs that participated in the group stages of that year's UEFA Champions League and UEFA Europa League, to its jury. The amount of journalists selected by European Sports Media was also increased to 55, representing each of UEFA's member associations.

Award history

Winners

Finalists

2010–11

2011–12

2012–13

2013–14

2014–15

2015–16

2016–17

2017–18

2018–19

2019–20

2020–21

2021–22

Wins by player

See also
 UEFA Club Footballer of the Year
 UEFA Club Football Awards
 UEFA Team of the Year

References

External links
 Official site

Best Player in Europe Award
Eur 1